Patrick de Gayardon (23 January 1960 in Oullins, Rhône – 13 April 1998 in Hawaii) was a French skydiver, skysurfer and a BASE jumper.

De Gayardon was famous for pushing the boundaries of skydiving. He was one of the first people to develop the unique style of skysurfing, in which skydivers use a snowboard to make aerobatic maneuvers. He also made many famous stunts with his development of a ram-air wingsuit, starting modern-day wingsuiting. In 1998 Patrick fell to his death in Hawaii during a skydive with Adrian Nicholas using the wingsuit while testing a modification to his parachute container; his death is attributed to a rigging error he made while making the modification.

References

1960 births
1998 deaths
People from Oullins
French skydivers
Aviation pioneers
Sports deaths in Hawaii
Parachuting deaths
Sportspeople from Lyon Metropolis